is a Japanese actress who is represented by the talent agency Oranku.

Filmography

TV series

Films

Dubbing
Legend of the Demon Cat, Lady Yang (Sandrine Pinna)
Frozen II, Queen Iduna (Evan Rachel Wood)

Awards

References

External links
Official profile at Oranku 
Official blog on GREE 
Official blog (From November 2007 to January 2017) 
Official blog on Yahoo (Discontinued in November 2007) 
Manager's official blog 
 
役者魂.jp 吉田羊インタビュー 

Japanese actresses
Living people
People from Kurume
Actors from Fukuoka Prefecture
1974 births